Penicillium arianeae is a fungus species of the genus of Penicillium which is named after Princess Ariane of the Netherlands.

See also
List of Penicillium species

References

Further reading
 

arianeae
Fungi described in 2013